Trick My Truck is an American reality television program that premiered on February 3, 2006, on CMT. Created by Varuna Films, the series features a group of vehicle hackers known as the "Chrome Shop Mafia" who renovate the trucks of "deserving" drivers in response to letters and calls from family and friends.

Premise
A group of seasoned vehicle body shop mechanics, which calls itself the "Chrome Shop Mafia", receive letters and calls from people informing them about truckers they feel are deserving of a truck "remodeling." The crew goes to "escape" the truck, primarily tractor-trailers, and give the drivers a similar loaner truck. The truck is taken back to the shop and remodeled completely, including customized designs on a specific theme, electronics enhancements, and mechanical upgrades to tires, exhaust pipes, etc. At the end of each episode, they bring in the driver to see their upgraded truck and give them a tour of what the auto mechanics have done to it.

In addition to tractor-trailers, the crew has overhauled pickup trucks and various specialty trucks such as dump trucks and an ice cream truck.

Cast
 Robert Richardson
 Ryan "Ryno" Templeton

 Matt Moore
 Steven Harrah
 Allen Harrah

Previous cast
 Rod Pickett
 Kevin "Ice Pick" Pickett
 Bryan "Boss Man" Martin
 C.B. Grimes
 Rick "Scrapyard Dog" Stone
 Richard "Scott" Draeger

Spin-off
A spin-off of Trick My Truck called Trick My Trucker premiered on CMT on November 10, 2007. The show features "trucker makeovers" in which out-of-shape truck drivers learn how to work out, eat healthier foods, and improve their appearance. The show is hosted by Bob Guiney and features trainer Aaron Aguilera and stylist Harmonie Krieger.

References

External links
 Official Chrome Shop Mafia website
 

Trucking subculture
CMT (American TV channel) original programming
2000s American reality television series
2006 American television series debuts
Automotive television series
English-language television shows